Cocking may refer to:

 Cocking affair, an attempt in 1941 by Georgia governor Eugene Talmadge to exert direct control over the state's educational system
 Cocking handle, a device on a firearm that results in the hammer or striker being cocked or moved to the ready position
 Cocking, West Sussex, a village, parish, and civil parish in the Chichester district of West Sussex, England
 Cocking-cloth, a device used for catching pheasants
 Edward Cocking (born 1931), British plant scientist
 Robert Cocking (1776-1837), British watercolour artist
 Samuel Cocking (1845-1914), merchant in Yokohama